Rain Simmul (born 18 August 1965, in Tartu) is an Estonian actor.

In 1988 he graduated from the Tallinn State Conservatory's Performing Arts Department. 1988–1999 he worked at Vanemuine Theatre. Since 1999 he is working at Tallinn City Theatre.

Selected filmography
 Surmatants (1991)
 Need vanad armastuskirjad (1992) 
 Karu süda (2001)
 Täna öösel me ei maga (2004)
 August 1991 (2005)
 Vana daami visiit (2006)
 Meeletu (2006)
 Detsembrikuumus (2008)
 Pangarööv (2009)
 Thibaut (2009)
 Kirjad Inglile (2011)
 Surnuaiavahi tütar (2011)
 1944 (2015)
 Vehkleja (2015)
 Polaarpoiss (2016)
 Räägitakse, et tomatid armastavad rokkmuusikat (2016)
 Naine on süüdi (2017)
 Tuliliilia (2018)
 Apteeker Melchior. Viirastus (2022)
 source: EFIS

References

Living people
1965 births
Estonian male film actors
Estonian male stage actors
Estonian male television actors
20th-century Estonian male actors
21st-century Estonian male actors
Miina Härma Gymnasium alumni
Estonian Academy of Music and Theatre alumni
Male actors from Tartu